The Sântoaderi were a group of supernatural entities found in Romanian folklore. Viewed as either seven or nine young men with long feet and hooves, they were also thought of as wearing capes. It was believed that they would mysteriously appear in a village, where they would sing, beat their drums, and cause illness for people; wrapping them up in chains causing rheumatism or stamping on their bodies.

The Romanian historian Mircea Eliade noted a similarity between the Sântoaderi and the zine, or fairies, who were also believed to travel through the night in a procession of dancers. There is also a belief that on the 24th day after Easter, the zine and Santoaderi meet together to play, and offer them bouquets of flowers.

References

Romanian legendary creatures
Romanian folklore